Hicham Sigueni (also spelled Seguini, ; born 30 January 1993) is a Moroccan long-distance runner who specialises in the 3000 metres steeplechase. He competed at the 2012 and 2016 Olympics, but failed to reach the finals.

Competition record

Personal bests
Outdoor
800 metres – 1:49.11 (Gaborone 2011)
1500 metres – 3:38.41 (Marrakech 2012)
3000 metres – 7:50.23 (Rehlingen 2013)
5000 metres – 13:26.32 (Rabat 2011)
3000 metres steeplechase – 8:16.54 (Stockholm 2015)
Indoor
3000 metres – 7:52.24 (Istanbul 2017)

References

External links

 
 
 
 

1993 births
Living people
People from Beni Mellal
Moroccan male middle-distance runners
Moroccan male steeplechase runners
Olympic athletes of Morocco
Athletes (track and field) at the 2012 Summer Olympics
Athletes (track and field) at the 2016 Summer Olympics
Athletes (track and field) at the 2010 Summer Youth Olympics
World Athletics Championships athletes for Morocco
20th-century Moroccan people
21st-century Moroccan people